All's Well That Ends Well is a play by William Shakespeare.

It is also a common proverb in English.

All's Well That Ends Well may also refer to:

TV
 "All's Well That Ends Well", a 1981 episode of BBC Television Shakespeare

Albums
 All's Well That Ends Well (Man album), an album by Man
 All's Well That Ends Well (Chiodos album), a 2005 album by the group Chiodos
 All's Well That Ends Well (Steve Lukather album), a 2010 album by Steve Lukather

See also
 All's Well, Ends Well, a 1992 Hong Kong comedy film and its five sequels